= Broom Villa =

Coordinates: 51.4710°N 0.2000°W

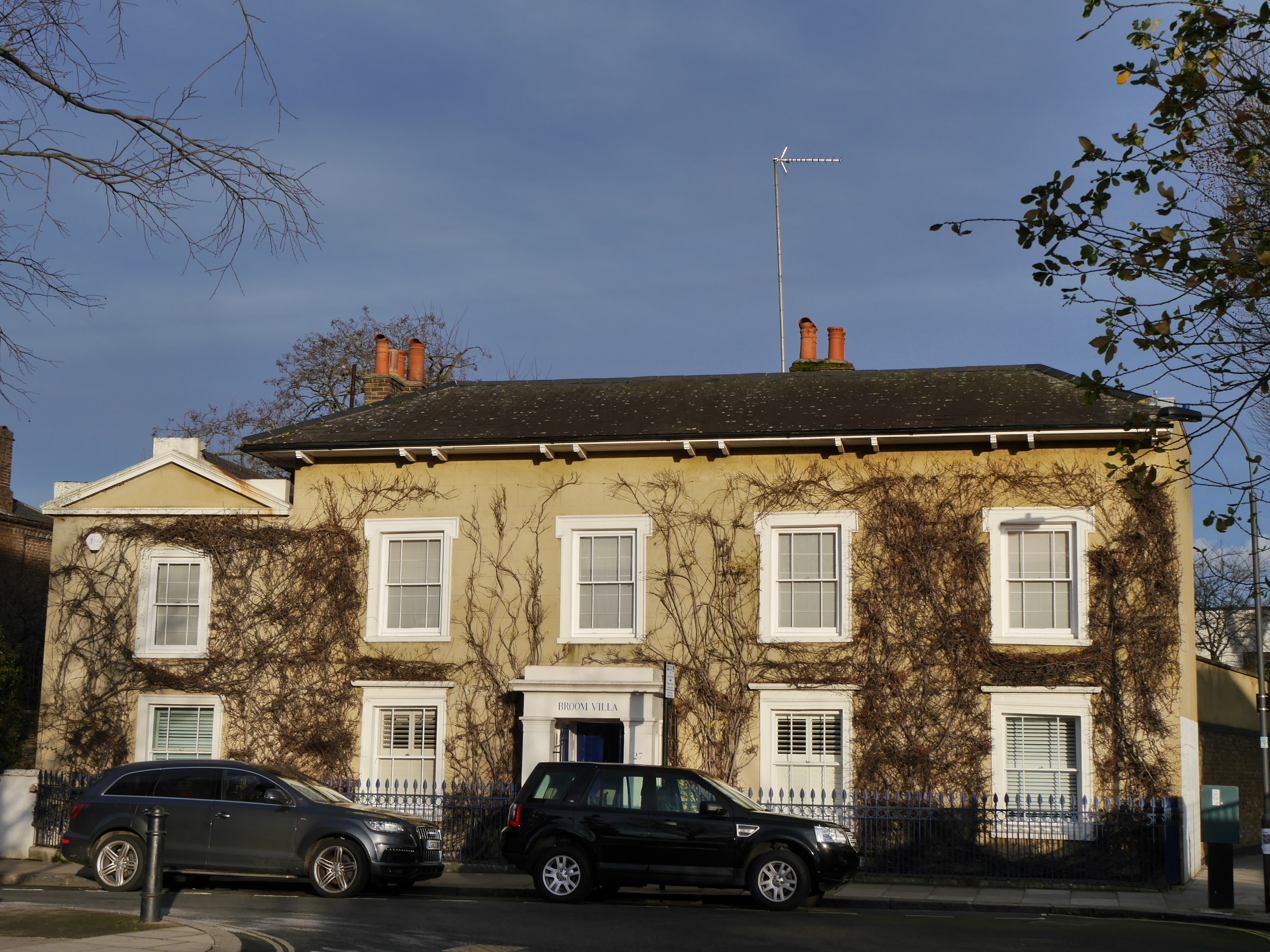
Broom Villa, Fulham, 2014

Broom Villa is a Grade II listed building at 27 Broomhouse Road, Fulham, London. It was built in the early 19th century.
